Eva Johnston (14 May 1865 – 30 November 1941) was an American philologist and classical scholar. She was the first woman to receive a doctorate from the University of Königsberg and was second woman professor at the University of Missouri.

Biography
Johnston attended school in Ashland, Missouri before further educated at Stephens College in Columbia and then at the University of Missouri from 1892. She worked as a Latin tutor at the university before spending time as a teaching fellow. She was the chair of Latin at Columbia High School.

From 1899 Johnston studied under Richard Heinze at the University of Berlin. From 1901-1904 she returned to the University of Missouri as the assistant professor of Latin. She again left Missouri, in 1904, to return to her graduate studies under Heinze. He was, by this time, at the University of Königsberg. Her research focussed on Latin comedy. In 1905 Johnston was the first woman to earn a doctorate from that institution. Her thesis was titled "De sermone terentiano quaestiones duae".

Johnston again returned to Missouri to teach Latin. She became the advisor to women from 1912-1921, latterly the Dean of Women from 1922. Johnstone became full professor of Latin in 1931, retiring two year later. She was named as a professor emeritus of Latin in 1938.

Johnston died on 30 November 1941. She is interred at the New Salem Baptist Church cemetery in Ashland, Missouri. An archive of her correspondence is held at the State Historical Society of Missouri. A hall of residence at the University of Missouri, Johnston Hall, is named after her.

Publications
Johnston, Eva. 1905. "Gemination in Terence", Transactions of the American Philological Association 36.

References

1865 births
1941 deaths
Women classical scholars
American philologists
Women philologists
Stephens College alumni
Scholars of Latin literature
University of Königsberg alumni
University of Missouri faculty
University of Missouri alumni
People from Boone County, Missouri